Newman/Haas IndyCar featuring Nigel Mansell, released in Japan as  and in South America as Newman/Haas IndyCar Estrelando Nigel Mansell, is an IndyCar racing video game developed by Gremlin Interactive and published by Acclaim, which was released in 1994 for the Super NES and Sega Genesis/Mega Drive.

Gameplay
This title can be considered as the sequel to Nigel Mansell's World Championship Racing, and is based on the 1994 IndyCar season featuring Nigel Mansell and the motor racing team Newman/Haas Racing.

Reception
GamePro gave the Genesis version a mixed review. They criticized the lack of a change view feature (which had by that time become standard for racing games) and the absence of graphical detail, but praised the split-screen multiplayer, highly responsive controls, and the choice of an intense, simplistic arcade mode and a simulation mode which demands careful, thoughtful decision-making from the player. They assessed the Super NES version to be not as good due to the less dramatic visuals and less realistic engine sounds.

Next Generation reviewed the SNES version of the game, rating it two stars out of five, and stated that "This game is repetitive, dull, and just not much fun."

See also
Newman/Haas Racing (video game)

References

External links
Nigel Mansell's Indy Car Japanese flyer at Giant Bomb

1994 video games
Champ Car video games
Acclaim Entertainment games
Gremlin Interactive games
Racing video games set in the United States
Sega Genesis games
Super Nintendo Entertainment System games
Video games scored by Mark Cooksey
Video games set in 1994
Video games set in Australia
Video games set in Canada
Multiplayer and single-player video games
Video games based on real people
Mansell, Nigel
Mansell, Nigel
Video games developed in the United Kingdom